Cusance is a commune in the Doubs department in the Bourgogne-Franche-Comté region in eastern France. It is the birthplace of the physicist Claude Pouillet (1791-1868).

Population

See also
 Communes of the Doubs department

References

Communes of Doubs